Honor of the Knights (also known as Honor of the Knights/Quixotic) is a 2006 slow film by Catalan auteur Albert Serra. The film re-envisions the adventures from the Miguel de Cervantes novel Don Quixote, eschewing the Cervantes narrative in favour of placing Quixote and Sancho Panza on a contemplative, wandering story. Serra explained that he chose the subject-matter of the film so he could "focus on atmosphere... on things I love better than just showing the plot... With these characters... I don’t care about being more or less faithful to the original source or character that comes from literature or history".

The film was screened at the Directors' Fortnight section of the 2006 Cannes Film Festival.

Reception 
Matt Zoller Seitz, writing for The New York Times, called the film "a virtual definition of the phrase 'acquired taste'", but added that "if you invest yourself in Mr. Serra’s vision, the film’s emotional payoffs are devastating". Honor of the Knights appeared in a tie for seventh place on Cahiers du Cinémas top ten list of 2007.

References 

General references

External links 
 

2006 films
2000s Catalan-language films
Spanish drama films
Films based on Don Quixote
Films directed by Albert Serra
2000s Spanish films